is a town located in Kanzaki District, Saga Prefecture, Japan. It is the result of a merger between the town of Mitagawa, and the village of Higashisefuri, both from Kanzaki District, on March 1, 2006. As of March 1, 2017, the town has an estimated population of 16,117.

Geography
Yoshinogari is located in the northern part of Saga Prefecture. Yoshinogari is very narrow north to south. The southern part contains the northern end of the Chikushi Plains (part of the Saga Plains), and north of the Nagasaki Expressway is the southern end of the Sefuri Mountains.

Adjoining municipalities
Saga Prefecture
Kamimine
Kanzaki
Miyaki
Fukuoka Prefecture
Fukuoka City, Sawara Ward
Nakagawa

History

In 1986, the remains of a Yayoi period moat-encircled village were discovered on Yoshinogari Hill at the site of a planned factory housing complex. The area was named the Yoshinogari site and the town name originates from here.
 April 1, 1889 - The modern system of municipalities is established, and the town area consists of Mitagawa Village and Higashi-Sefuri Village.
 April 1, 1965 - Mitagawa Village becomes Mitagawa Town.
 March 1, 2006 - Mitagawa Town and Higashi-Sefuri village merge to form Yoshinogari Town.

Education

Junior high schools
Mitagawa Junior High School
Higashi-Sefuri Junior High School

Elementary schools
Mitagawa Elementary School
Higashi-Sefuri Elementary School

Transportation

Air
The closest airports are Saga Airport and Fukuoka Airport.

Rail
JR Kyushu
Nagasaki Main Line
Yoshinogari-kōen Station

Road
Expressways: Nagasaki Expressway (Higashi-Sefuri Interchange)
National Highways: Route 34 and Route 385.
Prefectural Roads: Saga Prefectural Route 31, and Route 46

References

External links

Yoshinogari official website 

Towns in Saga Prefecture